Sciotoville is a neighborhood in the city of Portsmouth in Scioto County, Ohio. It is located at the intersection of U.S. 52 and State Route 335 between the village of New Boston and Wheelersburg in Scioto County along the northern bank of the Ohio River.  It has its own post office, but shares the ZIP code of 45662 with the city of Portsmouth.

History
Sciotoville was founded in 1835 and platted in 1841 by William Brown. A post office called Sciotoville was established in 1848, and remained in operation until 1920. It was annexed by the city of Portsmouth in 1921.

Public services
The residents of Sciotoville are served educationally by both the Portsmouth City School District and the Sciotoville Community School.  Their library needs are provided by the Portsmouth Public Library (located in downtown Portsmouth), with branches in nearby New Boston, South Webster, and Wheelersburg.  Sciotoville is also served by the Portsmouth Fire Department.  A station is located on Harding Avenue.

References

External links
 Sciotoville Community School (East High School)
Portsmouth City School District
The Famous Sciotoville Rock
Sciotoville in 1938

Portsmouth, Ohio
Neighborhoods in Ohio
Populated places established in 1835
Former municipalities in Ohio
1835 establishments in Ohio